Valmiki is celebrated as the harbinger-poet in Sanskrit literature.

Valmiki or Vaalmiki may also refer to:
 Vaalmiki (film), a Tamil-language Indian film
 Valmiki caste, a large cluster of castes and local groups from the Indian subcontinent
 Valmiki (1946 film), a Tamil-language film
 Valmiki (1963 Telugu film), a Telugu Hindu mythological film
 Valmiki (1963 Kannada film), an Indian Kannada film
 Valmiki (2005 film), an Indian Kannada drama film
 Valmiki (2019 film), the initial title of upcoming Telugu-language film Gaddalakonda Ganesh